Bulgária Esporte Clube is a Bulgarian football club based in Dili, East Timor. The team plays in the Super Liga Timorense.

References

Football clubs in East Timor
Football
Sport in Dili